Sydney Howard (7 August 1884 –  12 June 1946) was an English stage comedian and film actor born in Leeds, West Riding of Yorkshire.

Already a major stage star, Howard made his feature film début in Jack Raymond's Splinters (1929), and went on appearing in unique roles in films such as French Leave, Up for the Cup and The Mayor's Nest. Despite his popularity in the 1920s and 1930s films he appeared in, Howard is almost totally forgotten today. His most revived film is When We Are Married, in which he played a drunken photographer.

In 1937 British exhibitors voted him the 10th most popular British star at the box office.

Filmography

 Splinters (1929)
 French Leave (1930)
 Tilly of Bloomsbury (1931)
 Up for the Cup (1931)
 Splinters in the Navy (1931)
 Almost a Divorce (1931)
 The Mayor's Nest (1932)
 Trouble (1933)
 Up for the Derby (1933)
 Night of the Garter (1933)
 It's a King (1933)
 It's a Cop (1934)
 Girls, Please! (1934)
 Transatlantic Merry-Go-Round (1934)
 Where's George? (1935)
 Chick (1936)
 Fame (1936)
 Splinters in the Air (1937)
 What a Man! (1938)
 Shipyard Sally (1939)
 Tilly of Bloomsbury (1940)
 Mr. Proudfoot Shows a Light (1941, short)
 Once a Crook (1941)
 When We Are Married (1943)
 Flight from Folly (1945)

References

External links

English male stage actors
English male film actors
1884 births
1946 deaths
Male actors from Leeds
20th-century English male actors